Seth Burford (born March 11, 1979) is a former professional American football quarterback, playing for the NFL's then-San Diego Chargers in 2002. He played college football at Idaho State and then Cal Poly.

Early life 
Burford graduated from Oakdale High School in California.

College career 
Burford began his collegiate career playing for Idaho State, and transferred to Cal Poly after the 1998 season.

On November 4, 2000, Burford passed for 566 yards against 24th-ranked Northern Iowa, a single-game Cal Poly record, in a 43-41 loss. Two days later on November 6, 2000, ESPN/USA Today selected Burford as the national Division I-AA Offensive Player of the Week.

Professional career 
Before the 2002 NFL Draft Burford was regarded as a potential 4th to 7th round pick.  Scouts praised his "size, speed and strong arm" but were concerned about his "shoulder problems and his accuracy." The Chargers selected Burford in the seventh round of the 2002 NFL Draft with the 216th overall pick. 

Burford was rostered as the number-three quarterback, behind Drew Brees and Doug Flutie, with San Diego for the 2002 season, but didn't play in a regular-season game, before later being released the next fall after the 2003 preseason, on August 31, 2003. Burford's best preseason game came on August 28, 2002 during a 27-3 road loss to San Francisco, as he went 4-of-6 for a team-high 50 passing yards, and also rushed for 10 yards on three carries in the exhibition finale.

Also during 2003, he played for the Barcelona Dragons of NFL Europe, starting 10 games, throwing for 1,054 yards along with eight touchdowns and three interceptions.  In 2004 he signed as a free agent with the Kansas City Chiefs, who were hoping to draft him in 2002 before the Chargers took him, but he never played for them.

References 

1979 births
Living people
American football quarterbacks
People from Oakdale, California
Barcelona Dragons players
San Diego Chargers players
Cal Poly Mustangs football players
Idaho State Bengals football players